Anomis involuta, the jute looper or hibiscus cutworm, is a moth of the family Erebidae. It has a wide distribution, including the Cook Islands, Hong Kong, Japan, Korea, the Society Islands and Australia (including Western Australia, the Northern Territory, Queensland, New South Wales and Norfolk Island). It is also known from Kenya and Somalia.

The wingspan is about 40 mm. Adults are brown with a variable pale pattern and a central white spot on each forewing.

The larvae are considered a pest on Corchorus species, but have also been recorded feeding on Hibiscus tiliaceus and Commersonia bartramia. They are green with black spots and a pale brown head. Full-grown larvae are bout 30 mm long. Pupation takes place in a cocoon between the leaves of the host plant.

References

Scoliopteryginae
Moths described in 1858
Moths of Asia
Moths of Africa
Moths of Oceania